This is a list of Members of Parliament (MPs) elected to the Assembly of the Republic for the 8th Parliament of the Turkish Republic of Northern Cyprus at the 2013 parliamentary election, which was held on 28 July 2013.

The list below indicates the MPs in the parties in which they were elected; any change of political party is indicated separately.

Lefkoşa

Gazimağusa

Girne

Güzelyurt

İskele

References 

Members of the Assembly of the Republic (Northern Cyprus)